Gaura Bauram Assembly constituency is an assembly constituency in Darbhanga district in the Indian state of Bihar.

Overview
As per Delimitation of Parliamentary and Assembly constituencies Order, 2008, No. 79 Gaura Bauram Assembly constituency is composed of the following:
Gaura Bauram and Kiratpur community development blocks; Kothram, Jamalpur, Bauram, Neuri, Bhawanipur, Rohar Mahmuda, Parri, Itwa Shivnagar, Supaul, Biraul, Sahsaram, and Saho gram panchayats of Biraul CD Block.

Gaura Bauram Assembly constituency is part of No. 14 Darbhanga (Lok Sabha constituency).

The block consist of 13 panchayats: Kasround Karkouli, Aasi, Adharpur, Bauram, Goura Mansingh, Kanhai, Kasrour Basouli, Kasrour Belwara, Kumai, Mansara, Nadai, Nari, and South Kasround Karkouli.

Members of Legislative Assembly

Election results

2015

2020

References

External links
 

Assembly constituencies of Bihar
Politics of Darbhanga district